Gupol (also Romanized as Gūpol; also known as Goofol, Gopul, Gūfel, Gūfol, Gupa, and Kopā) is a village in Khorgam Rural District, Khorgam District, Rudbar County, Gilan Province, Iran. At the 2006 census, its population was 328, in 102 families.

References 

Populated places in Rudbar County